Svend Dinnes Hugger (22 March 1925 – 30 May 2017) was a Danish footballer who played as a midfielder. He made two appearances for the Denmark national team in 1950.

References

External links
 

1925 births
2017 deaths
Danish men's footballers
Association football midfielders
Denmark international footballers
Odense Boldklub players
Footballers from Odense
Danish football managers
Odense Boldklub managers
Viborg FF managers
Køge Boldklub managers
Silkeborg IF managers